The 2021 Akron Zips football team represented the University of Akron during the 2021 NCAA Division I FBS football season. The Zips were led by third-year head coach Tom Arth and played their home games at InfoCision Stadium in Akron, Ohio. They competed as members of the East Division of the Mid-American Conference (MAC).

Arth was fired on November 4, 2021.  His overall record at Akron was 3–24.

Previous season

The Zips finished the 2020 season 1–5 to finish in fourth place in the East Division.

Schedule

References

Akron
Akron Zips football seasons
Akron Zips football